Aequispirella is a genus of sea snails, marine gastropod mollusks, unassigned in the superfamily Seguenzioidea.

Species
 †Aequispirella bifurcata (Maxwell, 1992) 
 Aequispirella corula (Hutton, 1885)
 Aequispirella enderbyensis (Powell, 1931)
 Aequispirella finlayi (Powell, 1933)
 † Aequispirella iredalei (Finlay, 1924) 
 † Aequispirella kaawaensis (Laws, 1940) 
 † Aequispirella tenuilirata (Finlay, 1924)

References

 Kano, Y.; Chikyu, E.; Warén, A. (2009). Morphological, ecological and molecular characterization of the enigmatic planispiral snail genus Adeuomphalus (Vetigastropoda: Seguenzioidea. Journal of Molluscan Studies. 75(4): 397-418